The South Carolina Gamecocks women's beach volleyball team represents the University of South Carolina in NCAA Division I college volleyball. The team was founded as an independent in 2014, and has competed in the Coastal Collegiate Sports Association (CCSA) since 2016. Home matches are held at the on-campus Wheeler beach venue which sits between the Carolina Softball Stadium and Carolina Tennis Center.

History 
The South Carolina Gamecocks women's beach volleyball played their first season in 2014, led by head coach Moritz Moritz, who had previously served as an assistant coach on the Indoor South Carolina Gamecocks team. For the 2014 and 2015 seasons, the Gamecocks competed as an independent team; however, with the establishment of the NCAA Beach Volleyball Championship in 2016, the team joined the CCSA. They share this 6-team conference with fellow SEC all-sport member LSU; Florida State; Tulane; TCU; and Missouri State. The number of conference beach volleyball teams used to be between 10-14 members, but a host of former members, left to start Conference USA Beach Volleyball in 2021, leaving the CCSA with the current 6 team format beginning in the 2022 season. The Gamecocks have qualified for the NCAA Tournament twice under Moritz, in 2017 and 2018, but failed to win a match in either appearance.

Year-by-year results

See also
 South Carolina Gamecocks
 South Carolina Gamecocks women's volleyball
 List of NCAA women's beach volleyball programs

References

External links
 

South Carolina Gamecocks women's volleyball